491 is a 1964 Swedish black-and-white drama film directed by Vilgot Sjöman, based on a novel by . The story is about a group of youth criminals who are chosen to participate in a social experiment in which they are assigned to live together in an apartment while being supervised by two forgiving social workers. The film's tagline is: "It is written that 490 times you can sin and be forgiven. This motion picture is about the 491st."

This controversial film, which featured a male homosexual rape scene, was first banned in Sweden, but was rereleased after reediting. One of the excised scenes depicted a woman being raped by a dog. The film was also banned in Norway until 1971.
The reactions from especially conservative circles in Sweden were of disgust and outrage, and the outrage was among the reasons why the Christian Democratic Party was founded in 1964.

Cast
  as Krister
  as Nisse
  as Egon
  as Pyret
 Sven Algotsson as Jingis
 Torleif Cederstrand as Butcher
 Bo Andersson as Fisken
 Lena Nyman as Steva
 Frank Sundström as Inspector
 Åke Grönberg as Reverend Mild
  as Kajsa
  as Tester
 Siegfried Wald as German Sailor
 Willem Fricke / Wilhelm Fricke as German Sailor
 Erik Hell as Policeman
 Leif Liljeroth as Policeman

References

External links
 
 

1964 films
1964 LGBT-related films
Swedish black-and-white films
1960s Swedish-language films
Films based on Swedish novels
Films directed by Vilgot Sjöman
Swedish LGBT-related films
Films shot in Sweden
1964 drama films
LGBT-related drama films
Film censorship in Sweden
Film censorship in Norway
Film controversies in Sweden
Film controversies in Norway
LGBT-related controversies in film
Obscenity controversies in film
Animal cruelty incidents in film
1960s Swedish films